Mycobacterium brumae is a rapidly growing environmental mycobacterial species identified in 1993.  Aside from one 2004 report of a catheter related bloodstream infection no other infections by this organism have been reported.  It was first isolated from water, soil and one human sputum sample in Spain.

Description

Microscopy
Gram-positive, nonmotile, mostly strongly acid-fast rods, 2.0-2.5 µm long and 0.3 to 0.5 µm wide.

Colony characteristics
Flat, rough, and undulated yellow, nonphotochromogenic colonies

Physiology
Rapid growth occurs within 5 days at 25 °C, 30 °C and 37 °C, but not at 45 °C on Löwenstein-Jensen medium and Middlebrook 7H10 agar.
Production of thermostable catalase.
Positive for β-glucosidase, nitrate reductase, penicillinase, trehalase, urease and iron uptake.
Tween 80 hydrolysis after 10 days.
No accumulation of niacin, no degradation of salicylate to catechol.
No growth on MacConkey agar without crystal violet.

Pathogenesis
In 2004 a patient with breast cancer was reported to have a catheter related bloodstream infection.

Type strain
First isolated from water, soil and human sputum samples in Barcelona, Spain.
Strain CR-270 = ATCC 51384 = CCUG 37586 = CIP 103465 = DSM 44177 = JCM 12273.

References

Luquin (M.), 1993. Mycobacterium brumae sp. nov., a rapidly growing, nonphotochromogenic mycobacterium. Int. J. Syst. Bacteriol., 1993, 43, 405–413.
Lee, S.A, 2004. Catheter-related bloodstream infection caused by Mycobacterium brumae.  J Clin Microbiol. 2004 Nov;42(11):5429-31.

External links
Type strain of Mycobacterium brumae at BacDive -  the Bacterial Diversity Metadatabase

Acid-fast bacilli
brumae
Bacteria described in 1993